The Jaturamitr Samakkee (pronounced ) is a traditional secondary school football competition played by the four oldest boys' schools in Thailand: Suankularb Wittayalai School, Debsirin School, Assumption College, and Bangkok Christian College. It is held biennially, usually in November, at Suphachalasai Stadium in Bangkok, with the schools rotating as hosts.

Background
The first championship series was held from 16 October to 18 November 1964, with student unity as a central theme for the games. Subsequent competitions were held annually until 1985, except in 1966–1967, 1972, 1974–1977 and 1979–1980. From 1987, the competition continued on a biennial basis. It is a popular Thai football event, and outstanding players from the competition continue their careers by playing in the Thailand Premier League, including such figures as Thawatchai Damrong-Ongtrakul and Teerathep Winothai. The event is regularly broadcast on national television, and the three latest competitions have also been broadcast via live streaming video with live scores published on an official website. In addition to the matches themselves, great efforts are made to create elaborate displays and card stunts.

Although unity has always been the central theme of the competition (jaturamitr is derived from the Sanskrit  + , meaning 'four friends' and samakkee (from Pali ) translates as 'harmony' or 'unity'). The word Jaturamitr is often used as a catch phrase to refer to students or alumni of the four participating schools. Strong rivalries have developed between the schools. Especially intense are the rivalries between Suankularb and Debsirin and Assumption versus Bangkok Christian. This has led to several cases of inter-school violence during the weeks of the competition. The extent of the issue is such that strict audience segregation and security enforcement is required during the matches.

The latest, 29th competition, was held on 9 to 16 November 2019, hosted by Suankularb Wittayalai School. Debsirin School won the championship. The 30th competition is scheduled to be held on 2021, hosted by Debsirin School.

Tournaments

Jaturamitr Samakkee football match was founded in 1964 as the first year. The order of competition and host are as follows:

See also
 Chula–Thammasat Traditional Football Match
 Card stunt

References

External links
 Jaturamitr Website 

Football cup competitions in Thailand
Recurring sporting events established in 1964
1964 establishments in Thailand
Student sport in Thailand